Mankind Pharma is an Indian multinational pharmaceutical company, headquartered in Delhi. The company has products in therapeutic areas ranging from antibiotics, to gastrointestinal, cardiovascular, dermal, and erectile dysfunction medications.

Mankind Pharma is reportedly among the top two prescription drug companies in India by volumes. Mankind Pharma's Manforce is the largest condom brand in India by market share, while Prega News is the largest selling pregnancy test kit.

History 
Mankind Pharma came into existence in 1991, when it was formed into a legal corporation. Mankind Pharma actively started its operations in 1995. It started working as a fully integrated pharmaceutical company with the contributions of two brothers, Ramesh C. Juneja and Rajeev Juneja. The seed capital for establishing the company was  lakhs. The company was started with 20 employees and launched in two states in the first year of its operation.

The company acquired Magnet Labs Pvt. Ltd. to enter the antipsychotic segment in 2007. Also it acquired Longifene-an appetite stimulant for children in January 2010 which was earlier a brand of UCB.

In 2019, Mankind became the first Indian company and second only in the world to develop and launch Dydrogesterone, a drug used in high-risk pregnancies and infertility by the brand name Dydroboon.

It then acquired a respiratory treatment product and an infant skincare brand from Dr. Reddy's Laboratories. It also bought a majority stake in the Ayurvedic and herbal products manufacturer, Upakarma Ayurveda.

In 2022, the company entered agritech and pet care segments.

References

External links 
 
 Mankind Pharma at IBM

Generic drug manufacturers
Manufacturing companies based in Delhi
Pharmaceutical companies of India
Pharmaceutical companies established in 1995
Indian brands
Indian companies established in 1995